Kuku or kookoo is an egg-based and often vegetarian Iranian dish made of whipped eggs folded in various ingredients. It is similar to the Italian frittata, the French quiche, or an open-faced omelette, but it typically has less egg than a frittata, and it cooks for a shorter amount of time, over a low heat, before turned over or grilled briefly to set the top layer. It is served either hot or cold as a starter, side dish or a main course, and is accompanied with bread and either yogurt or salad. In parts of northern Iran, kuku might be used as a midday meal, and might be served with either plain cooked rice (kate) or bread.

Cookbooks from  Iran's Safavid and Qajar periods mention kuku. Qajar documents introduce it as a side dish. 
Herb kuku, which is the most popular type, is served traditionally at Nowruz, the Iranian New Year's Day, symbolizing a fresh start and also at Easter, which is celebrated by the Iranian Armenians and Iranian Georgians.

Cooking methods

The traditional preparation of kuku involves frying the ingredients in oil over a low heat and is accomplished with steaming in a closed space. Baking is also a popular method nowadays. An extra thickness is given to the dish by adding yeast. The ultimate result is a cake-like omelette that is usually served with bread, but it might rather be accompanied with rice, particularly in the northern Iranian province of Gilan, where the consumption of rice in general was traditionally preferred over bread.

Variations
Kuku is made with various ingredients and in a variety of styles, including herb kuku, potato kuku, eggplant kuku, roe kuku, and yogurt kuku.

Herb kuku
It is made of eggs and herbs such as leeks and parsley. Garlic, which is especially popular in the northern regions of Iran, is also used as an ingredient.

Potato kuku

Eggplant kuku

Roe kuku

See also
 Frittata, a similar Italian dish
 Eggah, a similar Arab dish
Egg bhurji
 Tunisian tajine, a similar Tunisian dish
Shakshouka
 Iranian cuisine
 List of egg dishes

References

External links
 
 
 
Baratzadeh, Emily. "Kuku Sabzi - No Dairy Frittata with Fresh Herbs" Kitchen Starts.

Iranian cuisine
Talysh cuisine
Azerbaijani cuisine
Kurdish cuisine
Egg dishes
Persian words and phrases